A suction excavator or vacuum excavator is a construction vehicle that removes heavy debris or other materials from a hole on land.

Description
Then the suction excavator hose removes materials below the surface. Compressed air is used to fracture the ground in order for the suction excavator to remove the material safely. No manual hand tooling is used in the process.

History of fan-based suction technology
RSP have been making suction excavators and stationary suction units since 1993. Since 2000, RSP developed a new suction principle, the ESE series. These vehicles work with the internationally patented suction principle which guarantees the highest degree of gravity separation, lowest contamination of the filters and thus consistently high suction performance.

Since 1998, the Mobile Tiefbau Saugsysteme has produced another type of suction excavator. It is said to have a new designed air flow principle, and thus a considerably improved suction performance compared to MTS previous designs.

Design and operation

RSP
Since 1993 RSP have produced suction superstructures mounted onto two, three and four-axle vehicles, stationary suction units as well as custom-made machines.

 	
The suction unit is roughly rectangular-block-shaped, about 2.5 meters wide and 3.6 meters high, and is usually mounted and used on the back of a truck, which must have power takeoffs to run the suction unit's air impeller and hydraulics. When it is emptying its load, the spoil tank lid (with the hose connection) hinges off to the right, then the spoil tank (with the filters) tips about 90° over to the left to tip out its load.

Possible applications include:

 Replacement of pipes and fittings
 Renovation and new installation of gas, water or heating pipes, cables, and sewage lines
 Exploratory excavations
 Railway trackside maintenance and repair
 Use of ground displacement rockets
 Clearing away environmental damage
 Replacement of contaminated soil around the roots of trees
 Removal of material in demolition projects
 Removal of gravel from flat roofs
 Cleaning blocked street gutters and gullies
 Operations involving the use of horizontal boring units
 Leaf removal
 Application for special operations

Suction excavators eliminate the need for costly and time-consuming manual labor. Buried pipe systems do not suffer damage. The output is up to sixteen times that achieved by conventional excavation.

In the ESE 32/7:
The suction pipe's internal diameter is 
Described as able to suck up "earth, stones, vegetable waste, sand, mud, water, pebbles, rubble, asbestos, railway-type ballast".
The suction pipe has a detachable extension nozzle narrowing from  internal diameter, with handles on a rotatable panel to open or close side vents to let the operator drop over-large objects which it has picked up.
Expected spoil extraction rates are roughly, in cubic metres per hour:

Mobile Tiefbau Saugsysteme
MTS in Germersheim, Germany has produced the following suction excavators since 1998:

Saugmaster

History of vacuum-pump-based suction technology

Pacific Tek
Pacific Tek was founded in 1993 and went into the valve exerciser and vacuum excavator industry. Pacific Tek founders have created innovations, such as the Angled Vacuum Excavator Tank (1997) and 180° Swivel Mount Valve Operator (1999).

Ditch Witch
The American firm Ditch Witch makes four models of suction excavators: FX20, FX25, HX30, HX50, FX50, FXT50, FX65, FXT65, and HX65; the number is its approximate horsepower. It is mounted on a semitrailer or rigid truck. It has its own engine (petrol for FX20 & FX25, the others diesel). Its spoils tank is cylindrical with somewhat rounded ends. Its suction hose is 3 to 4 inches diameter inside. Its spoil tank can be various sizes from 150 gallons (570 litres) to (4560 litres.)

Airex
Airex in the UK makes two current models of vacuum excavator: AX-68 and AX-180. Both systems are mounted on the back of rigid 7.5-ton trucks and designed for use in inner-city streets. The smaller design of these trucks gives less impact on their surroundings. The AX-68 uses a 4-inch hose but the AX-180 uses an 8-inch hose which can remove a tonne of earth in six minutes.

Ring-O-Matic
Ring-O-Matic in the U.S. makes several models of gasoline and diesel vacuum excavation units. They offer both trailer-mounted and skid-mounted models. Spoils tanks range in size from 150 gallons up to 2000 gallon tanks.

Vac-Tron Equipment
Vac-Tron Equipment in the U.S. makes more than 50 models of hydroexcavation and dry excavation gasoline and diesel vacuum excavators.

Cappellotto
Cappelotto makes various powered cleansing equipment including Capgeo (a model of suction excavator). Its arm is said to reach 7 meters and to swivel 250 degrees.

They also make Capbora, which is specifically for sucking up loose material. Cappelotto was founded in 1953 and is based at Gaiarine in the province of Treviso in Italy.

The Cappellotto products are also distributed to 40 countries in the world, with KOR Equipment Solutions being the distributor for Australia and New Zealand.

Uses
Suction excavators are useful to remove earth from around existing buried utilities or tree roots with much less risk of damaging them than using a conventional excavator with a metal bucket.

This type of excavation is held to be a safe and efficient form of excavation. However, it is totally unsuitable for archaeological excavation. Using a powerful vacuum and high-pressure water, precise holes, trenches, and tunnels can be cut to the required size and proportion. Because compressed air or water is used to loosen the earth, the risk of damaging underground utilities is less, and contractors can safely find and expose them. Often excavation reveals unknown utilities, saving lives, money, and time.

It is also referred to as "daylighting", as the underground utilities are exposed to daylight during the process.

This type of excavating is quickly becoming recognized as a best practice when working in areas with underground utility congestion and frozen ground. Hydro excavation lessens the risk of damaging utilities, which may often be inaccurately mapped and located and marked on the surface.

A suction excavator is useful in bulk excavation in confined areas, where its suction hose can reach in over or through barriers, e.g. digging a swimming pool in a courtyard.

It can be used on railways (perhaps mounted on a railroad car base) to suck old track ballast off the track when re-ballasting the track.

It can be used as a very heavy-duty vacuum cleaner to pick up miscellaneous debris, e, g, rubble, or big accumulations of fallen leaves or litter.

It can suck up liquids, e.g. water from a hollow. In case of opting for air vacuum excavation, the Positive Displacement Blower should be properly checked because it can move great volumes of air and a malfunction can cause a serious accident. When digging on rocky soils, it is better to opt for water instead.

National Grid Gas has ordered ten suction excavators.

As of July 2009 in England, the North West Gas Alliance has three German-made suction excavators.

Vacuum-excavation hire provider Utility Site Solutions work with utility and civil engineering companies throughout the UK to provide safer no-dig excavation. Projects include relocating underground utility lines to accommodate wider road lanes and filter lanes, and street works to provide essential maintenance of street lighting.

Utility Site Solutions specialist image library shows various uses of the new excavation technology including bridge refurbishment, clearing culverts, clearance of holding tanks, extension hose excavation, substations. rail excavations, airports, filter beds, lighthouse, and many more applications. Vacuum/suction excavators can excavate up to 140m horizontally and up to 20m depth depending on the type of material being excavated.

Specific jobs
Suction excavator jobs in Italy described in RSP Gmbh's publicity include:
In the old center of Venice:
Cleaning deep silt (accumulated over nearly 40 years) out of the Rio Terà San Polo, which was formerly a narrow open canal, but is now a roofed sewer under a busy street. The excavator sucked through a long hose. Access damage to its roof and the street above was limited to four manhole-sized holes, which afterward were fitted with manhole covers for future access. This avoided a long smelly traffic-obstruction-causing manual job.
Cleaning 1.6 meters deep silt out of the Rio Terà San Leonardo (a roofed sewer, 230 m long, 6 to 13 m wide): similarly.
The south loggia of the Palazzo della Ragione in Padua: Sucking out a big accumulation of rubble and dust and bird droppings. The space is roofed by medieval vaulting through which only one small access hole was allowed. A 150-meter-long suction hose was used. (In the accompanying photographs the rubble seems to be largely plaster removed from the walls.)
In Siena: removing about 150 m3 of rubble left by building restoration works, which had been dumped in old tunnels cut in tuff.

Vacuum excavation

Vacuum excavation significantly reduces the risk of loss of property and injury to workers associated with contacting or cutting underground utilities, as often happens if backhoe, auger, hand digging, or other mechanical methods are used.

Portable vacuum excavation equipment such as suction excavators can quickly dig small deep precisely-controlled holes to uncover buried utilities. Soft excavation technology can dig around buried pipe or cable without the risk of damage inherent with backhoes, excavators, or other mechanical tools.

Typically, vacuum excavation loosens the soil with a blunt-nosed high pressure air lance or water source and immediately vacuums away loosened material. Air and water, when used appropriately, are far less likely than sharp-edged tools to damage underground structures.

Depending on the machine used and soil conditions, a 12-inch-square 5-foot-deep pothole can be completed in 20 minutes or less. Most models are capable of digging deeper, but utility potholes seldom need to be more than six feet deep.

Vacuum excavation is best used in conjunction with the conventional underground (one-call) locating services. Because of a preponderance of overlapping buried utility lines, locating devices often miss some of the buried utilities on a site or cannot completely or accurately mark a site.

According to New Mexico One Call 811: Aligning Change, Locating with Potholing, "One-call paint marks and flags are the first steps in making the process of locating underground utilities safer, the use of vacuum excavation technology adds an additional margin of safety."

Potholing (which here means exposing buried utilities to find where and how deep they are) using vacuum excavation, has made it safer to find underground utilities.

When conventional locating is unworkable due to high densities of buried utilities, potholing can also be used to verify the route of each buried line within the excavation zone. In some cases, the contractor may choose to perform the entire excavation using vacuum excavation.

Today, according to "In the Pipeline" in an article on enewsbuilder.net, "As vacuum excavation technology and techniques for locating underground utilities has become both readily available and affordable, it's already considered by many municipalities as a Best Practice." Many governmental entities and municipalities no longer allow the use of backhoes to find underground utilities, citing the risk of damaging them. Many have ordered the use of vacuum excavation only.

To prevent utility strikes, the use of underground locating services has become the norm, and in most places, is required by law. However, the practice of underground location, while very useful, has its limitations. Locators have been known to miss some of the buried utilities or be unable to completely or accurately mark a site because there are many overlapping buried utility lines.

For these reasons, vacuum excavation can be an effective way to find, with virtually 100% accuracy, all underground structures in an excavation zone. Vacuum excavation is also typically more cost-effective than hand digging.

Through aggressive educational efforts about the safety of vacuum excavation, vacuum excavation is now being mandated in many states and municipalities, and efforts are underway to achieve universal acceptance of vacuum excavation as the preferred technology.

See also
Dredging
Gully emptier
Some street sweeper vehicles include a suction hose that the operator can control, but with less powerful suction and only able to pick up light loose litter and leaves.
Sometimes, "suction excavator" is used to mean a floating suction dredger for dredging underwater
Suction (medicine)

References

External links

Engineering vehicles
Excavations